Ålandstrafiken is a ferry company based in Åland, an archipelago of over 6,500 islands in the Baltic Sea, and a Swedish-speaking autonomous province of Finland. The company operates inter-island services as well as links to ports in western Finland. It has a fleet of 10 ferries. It also operates local buses.

See also 
 Transport on the Åland Islands

External links 
 Ålandstrafiken - official website

Transport in Åland
Ferry companies of Finland
Companies of Åland